

The DSK Airmotive DSK-1 Hawk was an unusual homebuilt aircraft designed in the United States in the early 1970s. While the design itself was utterly conventional - a single-seat low-wing cantilever monoplane with fixed tricycle undercarriage - its method of construction was not, since the DSK-1 Hawk used a surplus 200 US Gal military drop tank as its fuselage. Designer Richard Killingsworth sold over 250 sets of plans.

Development
The DSK-1 featured "drooping ailerons" that acted as flaps for short field operations.

Variants
A follow-on design, the DSK-2 Golden Hawk with a more conventional fuselage for builders who could not obtain a suitable drop tank. This was expected to fly in 1976, but on 12 April 1975, Killingsworth was killed when the Hawk prototype crashed shortly after takeoff.

Specifications (DSK-1)

References

 
 
 

1970s United States sport aircraft
Homebuilt aircraft
Low-wing aircraft
Single-engined tractor aircraft
Hawk
Aircraft first flown in 1973